The first Partition of Bengal (1905) was a territorial reorganization of the Bengal Presidency implemented by the authorities of the British Raj. The reorganization separated the largely Muslim eastern areas from the largely Hindu western areas. Announced on 20 July 1905 by Lord Curzon, the then Viceroy of India, and implemented on 16 October 1905, it was undone a mere six years later. The nationalists saw the partition as a challenge to Indian nationalism and that it was a deliberate attempt to divide the Bengal Presidency on religious grounds, with a Muslim majority in the east and a Hindu majority in the west. The Hindus of West Bengal complained that the division would make them a minority in a province that would incorporate the province of Bihar and Orissa. Hindus were outraged at what they saw as a "divide and rule" policy, even though Curzon stressed it would produce administrative efficiency. The partition animated the Muslims to form their own national organization along communal lines. To appease Bengali sentiment, Bengal was reunited by Lord Hardinge in 1911, in response to the Swadeshi movement's riots in protest against the policy.

Background
The Bengal Presidency encompassed Bengal, Bihar, parts of Chhattisgarh, Orissa, and Assam. With a population of 78.5 million it was British India's largest province. For decades British officials had maintained that the huge size created difficulties for effective management and had caused neglect of the poorer eastern region. The idea of the partition had been brought up only for administrative reasons. Therefore, Curzon planned to split Orissa and Bihar and join fifteen eastern districts of Bengal with Assam. The eastern province held a population of 31 million, most of which was Muslim, with its centre at Dhaka. Once the Partition was completed, Curzon pointed out that he thought of the new province as Muslim. Lord Curzon's intention was to specifically divide Hindus from Muslims, but not to divide Bengalis. The Western districts formed the other province with Orissa and Bihar. The union of western Bengal with Orissa and Bihar reduced the speakers of the Bengali language to a minority. Muslims led by the Nawab Sallimullah of Dhaka supported the partition and Hindus opposed it.

Partition

The English-educated middle class of Bengal saw this as a vivisection of their motherland as well as a tactic to diminish their authority. In the six-month period before the partition was to be effected the Congress arranged meetings where petitions against the partition were collected and given to impassive authorities. Surendranath Banerjee had suggested that the non-Bengali states of Orissa and Bihar be separated from Bengal rather than dividing two parts of the Bengali-speaking community, but Lord Curzon did not agree to this. Banerjee admitted that the petitions were ineffective; as the date for the partition drew closer, he began advocating tougher approaches such as boycotting British goods. He preferred to label this move as swadeshi instead of a boycott. The boycott was led by the moderates but minor rebel groups also sprouted under its cause.

Banerjee believed on that other targets ought to be included. Government schools were spurned and on 16 October 1905, the day of partition, schools and shops were blockaded. The demonstrators were cleared off by units of the police and army. This was followed by violent confrontations, due to which the older leadership in the Congress became anxious and convinced the younger Congress members to stop boycotting the schools. The president of the Congress, G.K. Gokhale, Banerji and others stopped supporting the boycott when they found that John Morley had been appointed as Secretary of State for India. Believing that he would sympathise with the Indian middle class they trusted him and anticipated the reversal of the partition through his intervention.

The day of partition (16 October 1905) also coincided with Raksha Bandhan day, which celebrates sibling relationships. In protest, renowned novelist Rabindranath Tagore made it compulsory for every individual to tie rakhi, especially to Muslims, to emphasize inter-religious bonds and that Bengal did not want partition.

Political crisis
The partition triggered radical nationalism.

Nationalists all over India supported the Bengali cause, and were shocked at the British disregard for public opinion and what they perceived as a "divide and rule" policy. The protests spread to Bombay, Poona, and Punjab. Lord Curzon had believed that the Congress was no longer an effective force but provided it with a cause to rally the public around and gain fresh strength from. The partition also caused embarrassment to the Indian National Congress. Gokhale had earlier met prominent British liberals, hoping to obtain constitutional reforms for India. The radicalization of Indian nationalism because of the partition would drastically lower the chances for the reforms. However, Gokhale successfully steered the more moderate approach in a Congress meeting and gained support for continuing talks with the government. In 1906 Gokhale again went to London to hold talks with Morley about the potential constitutional reforms. While the anticipation of the liberal nationalists increased in 1906 so did tensions in India. The moderates were challenged by the Congress meeting in Calcutta, which was in the middle of the radicalised Bengal. The moderates countered this problem by bringing Dadabhai Naoroji to the meeting. He defended the moderates in the Calcutta session and thus the unity of the Congress was maintained. The 1907 Congress was to be held at Nagpur. The moderates were worried that the extremists would dominate the Nagpur session. The venue was shifted to the extremist free Surat. The resentful extremists flocked to the Surat meeting. There was an uproar and both factions held separate meetings. The extremists had Aurobindo and Tilak as leaders. They were isolated while the Congress was under the control of the moderates. The 1908 Congress Constitution formed the All-India Congress Committee, made up of elected members. Thronging the meetings would no longer work for the extremists.

Response of Muslim Bengalis 

When first announced in 1903, Muslim organizations  the Moslem chronicle and The Central National Muhamedan Association condemned the proposal. Muslim leaders Chowdhury Kazemuddin Ahmed Siddiky, Delwar Hossain Ahmed denounced the idea. Reasons behind their opposition included the threat of partition to Bengali solidarity as well as fear that the educational, social and other interests of East Bengal would become diminished under a chief commissioner. In 1904, Curzon took an official tour to visit the Muslim-majority districts of East Bengal to gain buy-in for the proposal. He hinted that he was considering Dacca as the new capital of East Bengal and asserted that the plan "would invest the Mohamedans in Eastern Bengal with a unity which they have not enjoyed since the old days of old Musalman viceroys and kings."

Once the educated Muslims learned about the independence that a separate province would allow, most started supporting the partition. In 1905, The Mohammedan Literary Society published a manifesto endorsed by seven Muslim leading personalities with the urge for Muslims in East and West to support the partition measure. The impending notion of a new province provided the oft-neglected Muslim Bengalis a chance to raise their own voices and issues specific to their community and region. On October 16, 1905, the Mohammedan Provincial Union was founded to bring together all existing Muslim entities and groups;  Nawab Bahadur Sir Khwaja Salimullah was unanimously declared as the patron of this union.

Although the majority of Muslims supported the partition, a few prominent Muslim spokespersons continued to be against it. Due to family dispute, Khwaja Atiqullah, a step-brother of Nawab Bahadur Sir Khwaja Salimullah brought a resolution at the Calcutta session of the Congress (1906) denouncing the partition of Bengal. Some others included: Abdur Rasul, Khan Bahadur Muhammad Yusuf (a pleader and a member of the Management Committee of the Central National Muhamedan Association), Mujibur Rahman, Abdul Halim Ghaznavi, Ismail Hossain Shiraji, Muhammad Gholam Hossain (a writer and a promoter of Hindu-Muslim unity), Maulvi Liaqat Hussain (a liberal Muslim who vehemently opposed the 'Divide and Rule' policy of the British), Syed Hafizur Rahman Chowdhury of Bogra and Abul Kasem of Burdwan. A few Muslim preachers like Din Muhammad of Mymensingh and Abdul Gaffar of Chittagong preached Swadeshi ideas.

There were few who strived to promote Hindu-Muslim solidarity; such was the position of AK Fazlul Huq and Nibaran Chandra Das through their weekly Balaka (1901, Barisal) and monthly Bharat Suhrd (1901, Barisal).

In 1906, the All India Muslim League was founded at Dacca through the initiative of Nawab Bahadur Sir Khwaja Salimullah.  The traditional and reformist Muslim groups - the Faraizi, Wahabi and Taiyuni - supported the partition.

The Muslim-majority East Bengal had remained backward, since all educational, administrative, and professional opportunities were centered around Calcutta. The promise of a Muslim-majority East Bengal and its own capital in the region had made the aspiration for opportunities difficult in the past.

As the Swadeshi movement was tied to anti-partition agenda and glorified the Hindu history of the region, many Muslims felt concerned. Eminent authors like Mir Mosharraf Hossain were sharp critics.

Reunited Bengal (1911)
The authorities, not able to end the protests, assented to reversing the partition. King George V announced at Delhi Durbar on 12 December 1911 that eastern Bengal would be assimilated into the Bengal Presidency. Districts where Bengali was spoken were once again unified, and Assam, Bihar and Orissa were separated. The capital was shifted to New Delhi, clearly intended to provide the British colonial government with a stronger base. Muslims of Bengal were shocked because they had seen the Muslim majority East Bengal as an indicator of the government's enthusiasm for protecting Muslim interests. They saw this as the government compromising Muslim interests for Hindu appeasement and administrative ease.

The partition had not initially been supported by Muslim leaders. After the Muslim majority province of Eastern Bengal and Assam had been created prominent Muslims started seeing it as advantageous. Muslims, especially in Eastern Bengal, had been backward in the period of United Bengal. The Hindu protest against the partition was seen as interference in a Muslim province. With the move of the capital to a Mughal site, the British tried to satisfy Bengali Muslims who were disappointed with losing hold of eastern Bengal.

By 1911, the position of Bengali Muslims in East Bengal and Assam exhibited improvement. As opposed to one-eighth of the 1,235 higher appointments in 1901, Muslims in 1911 occupied almost one-fifth of the 2,305 gazetted appointments held by Indians.

Aftermath
The uproar that had greeted Curzon's contentious move of splitting Bengal, as well as the emergence of the 'Extremist' faction in the Congress, became the final motive for separatist Muslim politics. In 1909, separate elections were established for Muslims and Hindus. Before this, many members of both communities had advocated national solidarity of all Bengalis. With separate electorates, distinctive political communities developed, with their own political agendas. Muslims, too, dominated the Legislature, due to their overall numerical strength of roughly twenty two to twenty eight million. Muslims began to demand the creation of independent states for Muslims, where their interests would be protected.

In 1947, Bengal was partitioned for the second time, solely on religious grounds, as part of the Partition of India. East Bengal joined with the Muslim majority provinces in the western part of India (Balochistan, Punjab, Sindh, and the North-West Frontier Province), creating a new state of Pakistan.  East Bengal, the only non-contiguous part of Pakistan, was renamed "East Pakistan" in 1955.  In 1971, East Pakistan became the independent nation of Bangladesh.

See also
 West Bengal
 1947 Partition of Bengal

Notes

Further reading
 
 
 

Bengal Presidency
History of East Pakistan
Partition of India
Partition (politics)
1905 in India